Schlafly is a surname of German-Swiss origin. People with that surname include:

Andrew Schlafly (born 1961), American conservative activist, founder of Conservapedia, son of Phyllis
Hubert Schlafly (19192011), American electrical engineer, co-inventor of the teleprompter
Larry Schlafly (18781919), American baseball player
Phyllis Schlafly (19242016), American conservative activist
Thomas Schlafly (born 1948), American founder of the Saint Louis Brewery

Other entities:
 A trademarked brand name of beers produced by the Saint Louis Brewery

Not to be confused with:
 Ludwig Schläfli (181495), Swiss mathematician

German-language surnames